Cyrille Monnerais (born 24 August 1983 in Malestroit) is a French professional road bicycle racer who is currently a free agent.

External links 

1983 births
Living people
People from Malestroit
French male cyclists
Sportspeople from Morbihan
Cyclists from Brittany